The Architectural Conservation Award is given by the  in recognition of architectural conservation efforts by both the public and private sectors in Thailand. The awards, first given in 1982 and held annually since 2004, are presented to multiple winners in three categories, namely: buildings, people/organizations, and vernacular communities.

List of recipients

Buildings

Vernacular communities

Buildings worthy of conservation

See also
Architecture of Thailand
Cultural heritage conservation in Thailand

References

Heritage registers in Thailand
Architecture awards
Architecture in Thailand